Eels are ray-finned fish belonging to the order Anguilliformes, which consists of eight suborders, 19 families, 111 genera, and about 800 species. Eels undergo considerable development from the early larval stage to the eventual adult stage and are usually predators.

The term "eel" is also used for some other eel-shaped fish, such as electric eels (genus Electrophorus), spiny eels (family Mastacembelidae), swamp eels (family Synbranchidae), and deep-sea spiny eels (family Notacanthidae). However, these other clades evolved their eel-like shapes independently from the true eels. Eels live both in salt and fresh water, and some species are catadromous.

Description

They possess no pelvic fins, and many species also lack pectoral fins. The dorsal and anal fins are fused with the caudal fin, forming a single ribbon running along much of the length of the animal. Eels swim by generating waves that travel the length of their bodies. They can swim backward by reversing the direction of the wave.

Most eels live in the shallow waters of the ocean and burrow into sand, mud, or amongst rocks. Most eel species are nocturnal, and thus are rarely seen. Sometimes, they are seen living together in holes or "eel pits." Only members of the Anguilla regularly inhabit fresh water, but they, too, return to the sea to breed.

The heaviest true eel is the European conger. Other eels are longer, but do not weigh as much, such as the slender giant moray, which reaches .

Lifecycle

Eels begin life as flat and transparent larvae, called leptocephali. Eel larvae drift in the sea's surface waters, feeding on marine snow, small particles that float in the water. Eel larvae then metamorphose into glass eels and become elvers before finally seeking out their juvenile and adult habitats. Many eels remain in the sea throughout their lives, but freshwater elvers of eels in the family Anguillidae travel upstream and are forced to climb up obstructions, such as weirs, dam walls, and natural waterfalls.

Lady Colin Campbell found that the eel fisheries at Ballisodare were greatly improved by the hanging of loosely plaited grass ladders over barriers, enabling elvers to ascend more easily.

Classification
Several classifications of eels exist; some, such as FishBase, divide eels into 20 families, whereas other classifications such as ITIS and Systema Naturae 2000, include additional eel families, which are noted below the family with which they are synonymized in the FishBase system.

Identifying the origin of the freshwater species is considered to be problematic; however, genomic studies indicate they are a monophyletic group that originated among the deep-sea eels.

Suborders and families

Taxonomy based on Nelson, Grande and Wilson 2016.

 Suborder Protanguilloidei
 Family Protanguillidae
 Suborder Synaphobranchoidei
 Family Synaphobranchidae (cutthroat eels) [incl. Dysommidae, Nettodaridae, and Simenchelyidae]
 Suborder Muraenoidei
 Family Heterenchelyidae (mud eels)
 Family Myrocongridae (thin eels)
 Family Muraenidae (moray eels)
 Suborder Chlopsoidei
 Family Chlopsidae (false morays)
 Suborder Congroidei
 Family Colocongridae (froghead eels, short tail eels)
 Family Congridae (congers) [incl. Macrocephenchelyidae]
 Subfamily Heterocongrinae (garden eels)
 Family Derichthyidae (longneck eels) [incl. Nessorhamphidae]
 Family Muraenesocidae (pike congers)
 Family Nettastomatidae (duckbill eels)
 Family Ophichthidae (snake eels)
 Suborder Moringuoidei
 Family Moringuidae (spaghetti eels)
 Suborder Saccopharyngoidei
 Family Eurypharyngidae (pelican eels, umbrellamouth gulpers)
 Family Saccopharyngidae
 Family Monognathidae (onejaw gulpers)
 Family Cyematidae (bobtail snipe eels)
 Suborder Anguilloidei
 Family Anguillidae (freshwater eels)
 Family Nemichthyidae (snipe eels)
 Family Serrivomeridae (sawtooth eels)

In some classifications, the family Cyematidae of bobtail snipe eels is included in the Anguilliformes, but in the FishBase system that family is included in the order Saccopharyngiformes.

The electric eel of South America is not a true eel but is a South American knifefish more closely related to the carps and catfishes.

Phylogeny
Phylogeny based on Johnson et al. 2012.

Commercial species

Use by humans

Freshwater eels (unagi) and marine eels (conger eel, anago) are commonly used in Japanese cuisine; foods such as unadon and unajū are popular, but expensive. Eels are also very popular in Chinese cuisine, and are prepared in many different ways. Hong Kong eel prices have often reached 1000 HKD (128.86 US Dollars) per kg, and once exceeded 5000 HKD per kg. In India, eels are popularly eaten in the Northeast. Freshwater eels, known as Kusia in Assamese, are eaten with curry, often with herbs. The European eel and other freshwater eels are mostly eaten in Europe, the United States, and other places. Today, the European eel is considered critically endangered. A traditional east London food is jellied eels, although the demand has significantly declined since World War II. The Spanish cuisine delicacy angulas consists of elver (young eels) sautéed in olive oil with garlic; elvers usually reach prices of up to 1000 euro per kg. New Zealand longfin eel is a traditional Māori food in New Zealand. In Italian cuisine, eels from the Valli di Comacchio, a swampy zone along the Adriatic coast, are especially prized, along with freshwater eels of Bolsena Lake and pond eels from Cabras, Sardinia. In northern Germany, the Netherlands, the Czech Republic, Poland, Denmark, and Sweden, smoked eel is considered a delicacy.

Elvers, often fried, were formerly a cheap dish in the United Kingdom. During the 1990s, their numbers collapsed across Europe. They are now a delicacy, the UK's most expensive species.

Eels, particularly the moray eel, are popular among marine aquarists.

Eel blood is toxic to humans and other mammals, but both cooking and the digestive process destroy the toxic protein.  The toxin derived from eel blood serum was used by Charles Robert Richet in his Nobel Prize-winning research which discovered anaphylaxis (by injecting it into dogs and observing the effect). The poison used by Richet was actually obtained from sea anemones.

Eelskin leather is highly prized. It is very smooth and exceptionally strong. It does not actually come from eels, but rather from the Pacific hagfish, a jawless fish which is also known as the slime eel.

In culture
The large lake of Almere, which existed in the early Medieval Netherlands, got its name from the eels which lived in its water (the Dutch word for eel is aal or ael, so: "ael mere" = "eel lake"). The name is preserved in the new city of Almere in Flevoland, given in 1984 in memory of this body of water on whose site the town is located.

The daylight passage in the spring of elvers upstream along the Thames was at one time called "eel fare". The word 'elver' is thought to be a corruption of "eel fare."

A famous attraction on the French Polynesian island of Huahine (part of the Society Islands) is the bridge across a stream hosting three- to six-foot-long eels, deemed sacred by local culture.

Eel fishing in Nazi-era Danzig plays an important role in Günter Grass' novel The Tin Drum. The cruelty of humans to eels is used as a metaphor for Nazi atrocities, and the sight of eels being killed by a fisherman triggers the madness of the protagonist's mother.

Sinister implications of eels fishing are also referenced in Jo Nesbø's Cockroaches, the second book of the Harry Hole detective series. The book's background includes a Norwegian village where eels in the nearby sea are rumored to feed on the corpses of drowned humans, making the eating of these eels verge on cannibalism.

Sustainable consumption
In 2010, Greenpeace International added the European eel, Japanese eel, and American eel to its seafood red list. Japan consumes more than 70% of the global eel catch.

Etymology
The English name "eel" descends from Old English ǣl, Common Germanic *ēlaz. Also from the common Germanic are West Frisian iel, Dutch aal, German Aal, and Icelandic áll. Katz (1998) identifies a number of Indo-European cognates, among them the second part of the Latin word for eels, anguilla, attested in its simplex form illa (in a glossary only), and the Greek word for "eel," egkhelys (the second part of which is attested in Hesychius as elyes). The first compound member, anguis ("snake"), is cognate to other Indo-European words for "snake" (compare Old Irish escung "eel," Old High German unc "snake," Lithuanian angìs, Greek ophis, okhis, Vedic Sanskrit áhi, Avestan aži, Armenian auj, iž, Old Church Slavonic *ǫžь, all from Proto-Indo-European *h₁ogʷʰis). The word also appears in the Old English word for "hedgehog," which is igil (meaning "snake eater"), and perhaps in the egi- of Old High German egidehsa "wall lizard."

According to this theory, the name Bellerophon (Βελλεροφόντης, attested in a variant Ἐλλεροφόντης in Eustathius of Thessalonica),  is also related, translating to "the slayer of the serpent" (ahihán). In this theory, the ελλερο- is an adjective form of an older word, ελλυ, meaning "snake," which is directly comparable to Hittite ellu-essar- "snake pit." This myth likely came to Greece via Anatolia. In the Hittite version of the myth, the dragon is called Illuyanka: the illuy- part is cognate to the word illa, and the -anka part is cognate to angu, a word for "snake." Since the words for "snake" (and similarly shaped animals) are often subject to taboo in many Indo-European (and non-Indo-European) languages, no unambiguous Proto-Indo-European form of the word for eel can be reconstructed. It may have been *ēl(l)-u-, *ēl(l)-o-, or something similar.

Timeline of genera

See also
 Elver pass

References

Further references
 Tesch FW and White RJ (2008). The Eel. John Wiley & Sons. .
 Patrik Svensson (2019). The Book of Eels, English translation (2020) by Agnes Broomé, published by ecco, .

External links

 
 
 
"The Natural History of the Eel", historical aspect, Scientific American, 10 August 1878, Vol. 39, No. 6, p. 79

 
Articles which contain graphical timelines
Commercial fish
Elopomorpha
Extant Cretaceous first appearances